The 2003–04 Rose Bowl series was a women's cricket series held in New Zealand and Australia in February 2004. New Zealand and Australia played each other in six One Day Internationals, three in each country. Australia won the series 5–1.

Squads

Australia in New Zealand

1st ODI

2nd ODI

3rd ODI

New Zealand in Australia

4th ODI

5th ODI

6th ODI

References

External links
Rose Bowl 2003/04 from Cricinfo

Women's international cricket tours of Australia
Women's international cricket tours of New Zealand
2004 in Australian cricket
2004 in New Zealand cricket
Australia women's national cricket team tours
New Zealand women's national cricket team tours